The following is a list of presidents of Saltillo Municipality in the state of Coahuila, Mexico. The municipality includes the city of Saltillo.

List of officials

 Mauricio D. González, 1937-1938 
 Pedro Cerda, 1939-1940 
 Salvador Salazar, 1940 
 Jesús Daniel Aguilar, 1940-1940 
 Tomás Algaba Gómez, 1941-1941 
 Ricardo Villarreal, 1942-1942 
 , 1943-1945 
 Jesús R. Flores Luna, 1945 
 Evelio González Treviño, 1946-1948 
 Carlos de la Peña Santos, 1949-1951 
 Carlos Valdés Villarreal, 1952-1954 
 Manuel Valdés Dávila, 1955-1957 
 Eulalio Gutiérrez Treviño, 1958-1960 
 Eduardo Dávila Garza, 1961-1963 
 Roberto Orozco Melo, 1964-1966 
 Jesús R. González, 1967-1969 
 Arturo Berrueto González, 1970-1972 
 Luis Horacio Salinas, 1973-1975 
 Juan Pablo Rodríguez Galindo, 1976-1978 
 Enrique Martínez y Martínez, 1979-1981 
 Mario Eulalio Gutiérrez Talamás, 1982-1984 
 Carlos de la Peña Ramos, 1985-1987 
 Eleazar Galindo Vara, 1988-1990 
 Mario Eulalio Gutiérrez Talamás, 1990 
 , 1991-1993 
 Miguel Arizpe Jiménez, 1994-1996 
 Manuel López Villarreal, 1997-1999 
 Óscar Pimentel González, 2000-2002 
 Humberto Moreira, 2003-2005 
 Fernando de las Fuentes, 2006-2009 
 Jorge Torres López, 2010-2012
 Jericó Abramo Masso, 2010-2013
 , 2014-2017
 , 2018-current

See also

References

Saltillo
Politicians from Coahuila
History of Coahuila
People from Saltillo